Septa marerubrum is a species of predatory sea snail, a marine gastropod mollusk in the family Cymatiidae.

Description
The shell size varies between 30 mm and 50 mm

Distribution
This species is found in the Red Sea and in the Indian Ocean

References

External links
 

Cymatiidae
Gastropods described in 1985